Yi Eungro (in Hangul:이응노, in Hanja:李應魯, or Ung-no Lee; January 12, 1904 – January 10, 1989) was a Korean-born French painter whose works were chiefly focused on Eastern art, Korean paintings and printmaker. He was born in Hongseong County, Chungcheongnam-do and spent his childhood in Yesan county.

Biography
He learned how to paint and become concentrated on art work under Kim gyujin who was a famed calligrapher in Hanyang, current Seoul. Kim taught Yi about Four Gentlemen, Ink wash painting.  Next year, he was accepted to the art exhibition of Chosun, under the title of Mukjuk(inkwashing bamboo) and then graduated from Gawabata Art school which was shut down during Pacific War. He went to study in Japan under 松林桂月, a Japanese painter, expanding knowledge about western paintings and skills. In 1938, he continued to be accepted in several art exhibitions in Japan and Shenzhen, China.

He organized a group of artists named Dangu to sweep away the remnants of colonial rules from Japan and pursue a creative style of Korean arts. In 1948, he was seated as a dean of Hongik University in Seoul.

After leaving for France in 1958, he was influenced by Art Informel and European abstractionism. This enabled him to gain a reputation for modern painting skills using Korean traditional materials. He signed a contract with Galerie Facchetti in Paris and held an exhibition on collage. 1965 São Paulo international biennale gave him a bigger reputation as a painter in France.

He went back and forth from East Germany to meet his son who fell apart during Korean War, which involved him in a political scandal in 1967 which caught up tens of Koreans living in Europe under the suspicion that they spied for North Korean authorities. After two and a half years, French government supported him to be released and he headed to France after this incident.

The political scandal crippled his relationship with Korean artists later on, limiting his works to be initiated in France, Switzerland, Japan, United States and Belgium. Although he managed to hold his private art exhibition in 1975, he never came back to Korea since another political scandal ruined his stay in South Korea, which resulted in gaining French citizenship in 1983.

His works also gained opportunities to open art exhibition in Pyeongyang and he could eventually reunite his son. In 1989, his first exhibition in Seoul was held, whereas South Korean authorities rejected his visit in the end. Unfortunately, he died of heart attack at the opening day of this exhibition not to visit his motherland ever after.

Works

He was infatuated with European arts movement during which abstractionism swept the continent at the moment. His pieces were famous given that he experimented collaboration of inkstick and dyes not only on normal paper but also on Korean paper. He made use of college technique in his abstract paintings, widening his reputation.

I devoted myself to develop creative art what I would like to call as Koreanized abstract painting. My work departed from oriental paintings, Hanja and the movement and beauty of Hangul achieving my own style in line with beauty of canvas.
"나는 특히 한국의 민족적 추상화를 개척하려고 노력했다. 나는 동양화와 한자, 한글의 선의 움직임에서 출발, 공간구성과 조화로 나의 화풍을 발전시켰다"

Oriental art institute was established in Musée Cernuschi as of 1964 by himself to instruct Four gentlemen and Asian calligraphy to Europeans. After coming back from jail in South Korea, he focused on abstract paintings making use of letters. Since calligraphy is totally different from western art, he tried to maximize artistic viewpoints based on Asian philosophy.

Before his death, he only drew figures paintings emphasizing on active movement of people in a collaboration with forms of letters. Additionally, Gwangju massacre led him to concentrate on harmony of peace and people, drawing a large group of people dancing together. Those descriptions describe the swirl of Korean modern history from dictatorship to rapid development and political whirlpool he had faced.

Solo exhibitions

 1958 solo exhibition to celebrate his moving to France at the Central Public Relations Office in Seoul.
 1960 solo exhibition at International Contemporary Gallery in Washington, the US.
 1962 solo exhibitions simultaneously at Galerie Paul Facchetti and the Central Public Relations Center in Seoul.
 1963 solo exhibitions at Frederick gallery and Dahlem galley in Germany.
 1964 solo exhibitions at Galerie Numaga in Auvernier, Swiss and Max Kaganovich gallery in Paris.
 1966 solo exhibition at National Museum of Denmark, Coppenhagen
 1967 solo exhibition at Galerie Numaga in Neuchâtel, Swiss Auvernier.
 1969 solo exhibition <Collage 1969-1970> at Galerie Paul Facchetti in Paris.
 1972 solo exhibition by the Querini Stampalia foundation in Venice, Italy.
 1973 solo Exhibition at New Smith gallery in Brussels, Belgium.
 1976 solo exhibitions at Arras gallery in New York, Shinsegae gallery in Seoul, and Goryo gallery in France.
 1978 solo exhibition <People> at Goryo gallery in Paris.
 1979 solo exhibition <Folding screens> at Goryo gallery in Paris.
 1980 solo exhibitions at BIMC gallery, Goryo gallery in Paris.
 1983 solo exhibitions at Del Naviglio gallery in Milan, Italy.
 1988 solo exhibition at Simmons gallery in LA, Retrospective exhibition <1950-1980> in New York.

Publications and Films

 Lee Ungno, 「Appreciation and Techniques of the Oriental Painting」, Munwha Kyoyuk publishers (Seoul), 1956.
 Lee Ungno & Pierre Jaquillard, 「Calligraphie, Peinture Chinoise et Art Abstrait」, Ides et Calendes (Neuchâtel, Swiss), 1973.
 Film 「Lee ungno」 produced by Atelier Annick le Moine (Paris, France), 1976.
 Lee Ungno, 「L’art de peindre à l’encre de Chine」, Sarl Koryo (Paris, France), 1978.
 Lee Ungno, Park Inkyung & Tomiyama Daeiko, 「Seoul•Paris•Tokyo」, Kirokusa Publisher (Tokyo, Japan), 1985.
 Lee Ungno, 「L’art de peindre à l’encre de Chine」, Atelier de la Bonne Aventure (Versailles, France), 1988.
 Interview 「Lee Ungno」, Claude Jeanmart, Centre Régional de Documentation Pédagogique de l’Académie de Toulouse (Toulouse, France), 1972.

See also
 Isang Yun

References

External links 
 Art museum of Yi Eungro
 4 donated paintings of Yi Eung ro Yonhap

1904 births
1989 deaths
French people of Korean descent
20th-century French painters
French male painters
South Korean painters
People from Hongseong County
South Korean emigrants to France